Ronald Jonathan Quinteros Sánchez (born June 28, 1985, in Huancayo, Peru) is a Peruvian footballer. He currently plays for Universidad César Vallejo in the Peruvian Segunda División. He is also the younger brother of Henry Quinteros.

Quinteros was born in Huancayo, the son of Julio Ignacio Quinteros Surco († 2011).

Club career
Ronald Quinteros came out of the youth system of Alianza Lima. He was promoted to the first team in 2003 due to the players' strike. That season manager Julio "Humildad" García allowed him to make his Torneo Descentralizado debut in a 7–1 home win against Estudiantes de Medicina. In the same match Quinteros scored his first goal in the Descentralizado in the 69th minute.

In 2005, he played in the Peruvian Second Division for Deportivo Municipal during the 2005 season.

Honours

Club 
Universidad San Martín
 Torneo Descentralizado: 2007, 2008, 2010

References

External links
 
 
 
 

1985 births
Living people
People from Huancayo
Association football wingers
Peruvian footballers
Peru international footballers
Club Alianza Lima footballers
Deportivo Municipal footballers
Unión Huaral footballers
Club Deportivo Universidad de San Martín de Porres players
Unión de Santa Fe footballers
Club Deportivo Universidad César Vallejo footballers
Peruvian Primera División players
Peruvian Segunda División players
Argentine Primera División players
Peruvian expatriate footballers
Peruvian expatriate sportspeople in Argentina
Expatriate footballers in Argentina